Strickeria is a genus of fungi within the class Sordariomycetes. 

The genus was circumscribed by Gustav Wilhelm Körber in Parerga Lichenol. on page 400 in 1865.

The genus name of Strickeria is in honour of Otto Julius Felix Stricker (1818–1881?), who was a German doctor and botanist (Lichenology) and also was an Entomologist. He worked as a district physician in Stettin and Breslau.

Species
As accepted by Species Fungorum;

 Strickeria atraphaxis 
 Strickeria biceps 
 Strickeria calligoni 
 Strickeria convolvuli 
 Strickeria dendrostellerae 
 Strickeria desertorum 
 Strickeria dmitrieviana 
 Strickeria elbursensis 
 Strickeria ephedrae 
 Strickeria eurotiae 
 Strickeria everkenii 
 Strickeria halimodendri 
 Strickeria haloxyli 
 Strickeria iliensis 
 Strickeria kazachstanica 
 Strickeria kochii 
 Strickeria negundinis 
 Strickeria oxystoma 
 Strickeria oxystomoides 
 Strickeria patellaris 
 Strickeria pistaciae 
 Strickeria populina 
 Strickeria pseudostromatica 
 Strickeria rhois 
 Strickeria sarhaddensis 
 Strickeria schwarzmanniana 
 Strickeria scutellata 
 Strickeria silenes 
 Strickeria spiraeae 
 Strickeria spiraeanthi 
 Strickeria trichanthemidis 
 Strickeria turkestanica 
 Strickeria uspallatensis 

Former species;

 S. ampullacea  = Teichospora ampullacea, Teichosporaceae
 S. amygdaloides  = Chaetoplea amygdaloides, Phaeosphaeriaceae
 S. aspera  = Chaetoplea aspera, Phaeosphaeriaceae
 S. brevirostris  = Teichospora brevirostris, Teichosporaceae
 S. buxi  = Hypoxylon buxi, Hypoxylaceae
 S. cephalandrae  = Pleospora cephalandrae, Pleosporaceae
 S. commutata  = Teichospora commutata, Teichosporaceae
 S. coronata  = Cilioplea coronata, Lophiostomataceae
 S. crossota  = Chaetoplea crossota, Phaeosphaeriaceae
 S. deflectens  = Teichospora deflectens, Teichosporaceae
 S. denudata  = Teichosporella denudata, Dothideomycetes
 S. dura  = Teichosporella dura, Dothideomycetes
 S. fulgurata  = Cilioplea fulgurata, Lophiostomataceae
 S. helenae  = Chaetoplea helenae, Phaeosphaeriaceae
 S. hispida  = Pleosphaeria hispida, Sordariomycetes
 S. ignavis  = Teichospora ignavis, Teichosporaceae
 S. incisa  = Platystomum incisum, Lophiostomataceae
 S. interstitialis  = Cucurbitaria interstitialis, Cucurbitariaceae
 S. inverecunda  = Chaetoplea inverecunda, Phaeosphaeriaceae
 S. jungermannicola  = Pleostigma jungermannicola, Dothideomycetes
 S. kelseyi  = Phragmodothella kelseyi, Sporocadaceae
 S. kravtzevii  = Pleospora kravtzevii, Pleosporaceae
 S. longispora  = Chaetoplea longispora, Phaeosphaeriaceae
 S. mammoides  = Decaisnella mammoides, Massariaceae
 S. mesascium  = Decaisnella mesascium, Massariaceae
 S. minima  = Capronia minima, Herpotrichiellaceae
 S. muricata  = Discostroma muricatum, Sporocadaceae
 S. mutabilis  = Pseudotrichia mutabilis, Melanommataceae
 S. nitida  = Pleospora nitida, Pleosporaceae
 S. nubilosa  = Chaetoplea nubilosa, Phaeosphaeriaceae
 S. obducens  = Praetumpfia obducens, Melanommataceae
 S. obtusa  = Montagnula obtusa, Didymosphaeriaceae
 S. ohiensis  = Thyridium ohiense, Thyridiaceae
 S. pilosella  = Pleosphaeria pilosella, Sordariomycetes
 S. pinea  = Praetumpfia obducens, Melanommataceae
 S. princeps  = Decaisnella princeps, Massariaceae
 S. propendula  = Discostroma propendulum, Sporocadaceae
 S. pygmaea  = Pleospora pygmaea, Pleosporaceae
 S. rabenhorstii  = Cucurbitaria rabenhorstii, Cucurbitariaceae
 S. seminuda  = Requienella seminuda, Requienellaceae
 S. solitaria  = Cucurbitaria solitaria, Cucurbitariaceae
 S. spectabilis  = Decaisnella spectabilis, Massariaceae
 S. taphrina  = Massarina taphrina, Massarinaceae
 S. tenacella  = Cucurbitaria tenacella, Cucurbitariaceae
 S. trabicola  = Teichospora trabicola, Teichosporaceae
 S. umbonata  = Karstenula umbonata, Didymosphaeriaceae
 S. vaga  = Capronia vaga, Herpotrichiellaceae
 S. variabilis  = Chaetoplea variabilis, Phaeosphaeriaceae
 S. vilis  = Melanomma vile, Melanommataceae
 S. vitalbae  = Pleospora vitalbae, Pleosporaceae
 S. vitalbae var. minor  = Pleospora vitalbae, Pleosporaceae

References

Sordariomycetes